The 1975 Pacific typhoon season was one of the deadliest tropical cyclone seasons on record, with nearly 229,000 fatalities occurring during the season. It had no official bounds; it ran year-round in 1975, but most tropical cyclones tend to form in the northwestern Pacific Ocean between June and December. These dates conventionally delimit the period of each year when most tropical cyclones form in the northwestern Pacific Ocean.

Tropical Storms formed in the entire west pacific basin were assigned a name by the Joint Typhoon Warning Center. Tropical depressions in this basin have the "W" suffix added to their number. Tropical depressions that enter or form in the Philippine area of responsibility are assigned a name by the Philippine Atmospheric, Geophysical and Astronomical Services Administration or PAGASA. This can often result in the same storm having two names.

Some of the notable storms here are Typhoon Nina, which caused the Banqiao Dam flood, which resulted in approximately 126,000 people dead, and Typhoon June, which was the strongest storm on record with a pressure of 875 mbar, until beaten by Typhoon Tip in 1979 with 870 mbar.

Systems 

25 tropical depressions formed this year in the Western Pacific, of which 20 became tropical storms. 14 storms reached typhoon intensity, of which 3 reached super typhoon strength.

Typhoon Lola (Auring) 

Typhoon Lola (Auring) was a very early typhoon. It made landfall on Mindanao as a minimal typhoon on January 24 and transversed the southern Philippines as a tropical storm. Lola crossed the South China Sea before stalling in the open sea and dissipating on January 28. The typhoon caused 30 casualties from mudslides and heavy rain.

Tropical Depression 02W 

Tropical Depression 02W formed over the Philippines and crossed them before dissipating over the South China Sea.

Tropical Storm Mamie 

Tropical Storm Mamie formed north of Guam, and briefly attained tropical storm status before weakening. It then passed south of Japan as a tropical depression before dissipating just south of Korea.

Typhoon Nina (Bebeng) 

Nina was a short-lived but rapidly intensifying typhoon. After forming on July 30, it struck Taiwan at super typhoon intensity. It stayed a typhoon during its passage over the island, causing 25 fatalities and widespread damage. It emerged into the Formosa Strait and weakened to a tropical storm. Nina headed inland. Its moisture interacted with a cold front, causing a huge amount of rainfall. The rainfall contributed to the bursting of the Banqiao Dam, causing the deaths of at least 229,000 people.

Tropical Depression 05W (Karing) 

Tropical Depression 05W (Karing) formed east-northeast of the Philippines and traveled north then northwest before dissipating off the coast of China.

Typhoon Ora (Diding) 

Typhoon Ora first developed as an weak circulation on August 9th. The influence of a nearby upper-level trough allowed it to intensify from a depression to a Category 1 typhoon in 30 hours. The typhoon passed Okinawa before making landfall in China near Wenzhou. It dissipated over land a few days later. Choppy seas caused by Ora sank a crowded motorboat near Leyte, killing 15 people.

Typhoon Rita 

Rita formed August 17 and erratically headed north and affected the Ryūkyū Islands. Rita then made landfall on Shikoku as a moderately strong Category 1 typhoon. It moved along the entire length of Japan, weakening to a depression. Rita strengthened back into a tropical storm over the Kuril Islands— an unusually northerly location— before dissipating on August 24. At least 26 deaths can be attributed to this typhoon from the heavy flooding— the worst in 10 years.

Typhoon Phyllis 

Phyllis struck the southern part of Japan on August 17 as a minimal typhoon, having weakened from a peak of 140 mph winds. Phyllis caused over 60 casualties, with landslides and flooding causing moderate to heavy damage.

Severe Tropical Storm Susan 

Tropical Storm Susan formed far southwest of Tokyo, and slowly traveled northwards, reaching tropical storm intensity before weakening and finally dissipating on the 3rd of September at sea west of Hokkaido.

Typhoon Tess 

Typhoon Tess was first noted as a closed circulation on the 1st of September 600 nautical miles east-northeast of Saipan. The storm intensified over the next few days, becoming a typhoon on the 3rd. The cyclone reached its peak intensity on the 4th. Tess then weakened, losing typhoon status on the 8th, and dissipating over the Sea of Irkutsk on the 10th, being absorbed into a frontal system.

Tropical Storm Viola (Gening) 

Tropical Storm Viola formed at sea east of the Philippines and tracked northeast before dissipating four days later.

Typhoon Winnie 

Typhoon Winnie was first detected as a disturbance on the 5th of September, but it did not become a circulation until the 8th. Winnie tracked northwards, becoming a category 1 typhoon, but an unfavorable environment prevented it from intensifying further. It became extratropical on the 12th.

Typhoon Alice (Herming) 

Typhoon Alice, (Not to be confused with Typhoon Alice from 1979) hit the Philippine island of Luzon, It weakened over the South China Sea then struck China and Vietnam as a tropical storm, Then it finally dissipated over Thailand.

Typhoon Betty (Ising) 

Betty hit Taiwan and China.

Typhoon Cora (Luding) 

Cora re-curved east of Japan.

Severe Tropical Storm Doris 

Doris hit China as a high-end tropical storm.

Typhoon Elsie (Mameng) 

Elsie hit Hong Kong.

Typhoon Flossie (Neneng) 

Flossie struck the extreme southern part of China at Category 1 intensity. 44 people were lost from 2 freighters sinking.

Severe Tropical Storm Grace (Oniang) 

Grace moved northwest away from the Philippines.

Tropical Storm Helen (Pepang) 

Helen hit Vietnam and the Philippines.

Typhoon Ida 

Ida recurved out to sea and had no effect on land.

Typhoon June (Rosing) 
On November 15, a disturbance was first detected in the monsoon trough well to the southeast of Guam, before finally developing into a tropical depression on November 16. Moving erratically, the depression was then later upgraded by the JTWC to a tropical storm. During November 17-18 June then began to explosively deepen as it moved to the north in response to a weakness in the ridge caused by a nearby trough, deepening as much as 52 mbars in under 12 hours, and 90 mbars in 24 hours. Early on November 19, a US Air Force reconnaissance aircraft measured a near record low pressure of 875mb just off the eyewall, indicating it could have been stronger. Shortly after the near-record peak, June then began a eyewall replacement cycle, becoming one of the first recorded cases of triple eyewalls. It then began to slowly weaken as it moved northwest, weakening below category 5 status early on November 21, before beginning to recurve to the northeast as it began extratropical transition, achieving a forward speed as high as 70mph. June finally became extratropical late on November 23. The remnants then became a powerful extratropical storm, with a pressure of 960mb before it was last noted over far northeastern Siberia.

Typhoon June never made landfall, but passed 230 miles west of Guam, causing severe flooding.  There were no casualties, but several buildings were destroyed by the strong winds by June, and storm surge and crop damage was estimated at $300,000.

Tropical Storm 25W 

25W formed in the South China Sea.

Tropical Depression 24W (Sisang) 

A late season tropical depression affected the Philippines before turning back toward the ocean and dissipated out at sea.

Storm names

International 
Western North Pacific tropical cyclones were named by the Joint Typhoon Warning Center. The first storm of 1975 was named Lola and the final one was named June.

Philippines 

The Philippine Atmospheric, Geophysical and Astronomical Services Administration uses its own naming scheme for tropical cyclones in their area of responsibility. PAGASA assigns names to tropical depressions that form within their area of responsibility and any tropical cyclone that might move into their area of responsibility. Should the list of names for a given year prove to be insufficient, names are taken from an auxiliary list, the first 6 of which are published each year before the season starts. Names not retired from this list will be used again in the 1979 season. This is the same list used for the 1971 season. PAGASA uses its own naming scheme that starts in the Filipino alphabet, with names of Filipino female names ending with "ng" (A, B, K, D, etc.).

Season effects 
This table will list all the storms that developed in the northwestern Pacific Ocean west of the International Date Line and north of the equator during 1975. It will include their intensity, duration, name, areas affected, deaths, and damage totals. Classification and intensity values will be based on estimations conducted by the JMA, the JTWC, and/or PAGASA. Peak wind speeds are in one-minute sustained standards unless otherwise noted. All damage figures will be in 1975 USD. Damages and deaths from a storm will include when the storm was a precursor wave or an extratropical low.

|-
| Lola (Auring) ||  || bgcolor=#| || bgcolor=#| || bgcolor=#| || Philippines || Unknown ||  ||
|-
| 02W ||  || bgcolor=#| || bgcolor=#| || bgcolor=#| || Philippines ||  ||  ||
|-
| TD ||  || bgcolor=#| || bgcolor=#| || bgcolor=#| || Philippines ||  ||  ||
|-
| TD ||  || bgcolor=#| || bgcolor=#| || bgcolor=#| || South China, Vietnam ||  ||  ||
|-
| TD ||  || bgcolor=#| || bgcolor=#| || bgcolor=#| || None ||  ||  ||
|-
| TD ||  || bgcolor=#| || bgcolor=#| || bgcolor=#| || Mariana Islands ||  ||  ||
|-
| TD ||  || bgcolor=#| || bgcolor=#| || bgcolor=#| || None ||  ||  ||
|-
| Mamie ||  || bgcolor=#| || bgcolor=#| || bgcolor=#| || Japan ||  ||  ||
|-
| Nina (Bebeng) ||  || bgcolor=#| || bgcolor=#| || bgcolor=#| || Taiwan, Ryukyu Islands, East China ||  ||  ||
|-
| 05W (Karing) ||  || bgcolor=#| || bgcolor=#| || bgcolor=#| || Taiwan ||  ||  ||
|-
| Ora (Diding) ||  || bgcolor=#| || bgcolor=#| || bgcolor=#| || Taiwan, Ryukyu Islands, East China || None || None ||
|-
| TD ||  || bgcolor=#| || bgcolor=#| || bgcolor=#| || Philippines ||  ||  ||
|-
| Rita ||  || bgcolor=#| || bgcolor=#| || bgcolor=#| || China, Ryukyu Islands, Taiwan, Japan ||  ||  ||
|-
| Phyllis ||  || bgcolor=#| || bgcolor=#| || bgcolor=#| || Japan ||  ||  ||
|-
| TD ||  || bgcolor=#| || bgcolor=#| || bgcolor=#| || Ryukyu Islands ||  ||  ||
|-
| TD ||  || bgcolor=#| || bgcolor=#| || bgcolor=#| || South China, Vietnam ||  ||  ||
|-
| Susan ||  || bgcolor=#| || bgcolor=#| || bgcolor=#| || Japan || None || None||
|-
| TD ||  || bgcolor=#| || bgcolor=#| || bgcolor=#| || None ||  ||  ||
|-
| TD ||  || bgcolor=#| || bgcolor=#| || bgcolor=#| || South China, Vietnam ||  ||  ||
|-
| Tess ||  || bgcolor=#| || bgcolor=#| || bgcolor=#| || None || None || None ||
|-
| Viola (Gening) ||  || bgcolor=#| || bgcolor=#| || bgcolor=#| || None ||  ||  ||
|-
| TD ||  || bgcolor=#| || bgcolor=#| || bgcolor=#| || Vietnam, Laos ||  ||  ||
|-
| Winnie ||  || bgcolor=#| || bgcolor=#| || bgcolor=#| || None || None || None ||
|-
| TD ||  || bgcolor=#| || bgcolor=#| || bgcolor=#| || None ||  ||  ||
|-
| Alice (Herming) ||  || bgcolor=#| || bgcolor=#| || bgcolor=#| || Philippines, South China, Vietnam, Laos || Unknown || Unknown ||
|-
| Betty (Ising) ||  || bgcolor=#| || bgcolor=#| || bgcolor=#| || Taiwan, East China || Unknown || Unknown ||
|-
| TD ||  || bgcolor=#| || bgcolor=#| || bgcolor=#| || None ||  ||  ||
|-
| Cora (Luding) ||  || bgcolor=#| || bgcolor=#| || bgcolor=#| || Ryukyu Islands, Japan || None || None ||
|-
| Doris ||  || bgcolor=#| || bgcolor=#| || bgcolor=#| || China || Unknown || Unknown ||
|-
| Elsie (Mameng) ||  || bgcolor=#| || bgcolor=#| || bgcolor=#| || Philippines, Taiwan, South China || Unknown || Unknown ||
|-
| 18W ||  || bgcolor=#| || bgcolor=#| || bgcolor=#| || Taiwan ||  ||  ||
|-
| Flossie (Neneng) ||  || bgcolor=#| || bgcolor=#| || bgcolor=#| || Philippines, South China || Unknown ||  ||
|-
| Grace (Oyang) ||  || bgcolor=#| || bgcolor=#| || bgcolor=#| || None || None || None ||
|-
| TD ||  || bgcolor=#| || bgcolor=#| || bgcolor=#| || Mariana Islands ||  ||  ||
|-
| Helen (Pepang) ||  || bgcolor=#| || bgcolor=#| || bgcolor=#| || Philippines, Vietnam, Cambodia ||  ||  ||
|-
| Ida ||  || bgcolor=#| || bgcolor=#| || bgcolor=#| || Caroline Islands, Mariana Islands || None || None ||
|-
| June (Rosing) ||  || bgcolor=#| || bgcolor=#| || bgcolor=#| || Caroline Islands, Mariana Islands || None || None ||
|-
| 25W ||  || bgcolor=#| || bgcolor=#| || bgcolor=#| || Philippines ||  ||  ||
|-
| 24W (Sisang) ||  || bgcolor=#| || bgcolor=#| || bgcolor=#| || Philippines ||  ||  ||
|-

See also 

 1975 Pacific hurricane season
 1975 Atlantic hurricane season
 1975 North Indian Ocean cyclone season
 Australian cyclone seasons: 1974–75, 1975–76
 South Pacific cyclone seasons: 1974–75, 1975–76
 South-West Indian Ocean cyclone seasons: 1974–75, 1975–76

References

External links 
 Japan Meteorological Agency
 Joint Typhoon Warning Center .
 China Meteorological Agency
 National Weather Service Guam
 Hong Kong Observatory
 Macau Meteorological Geophysical Services
 Korea Meteorological Agency
 Philippine Atmospheric, Geophysical and Astronomical Services Administration
 Taiwan Central Weather Bureau
 Digital Typhoon - Typhoon Images and Information
 Typhoon2000 Philippine typhoon website